Young Desire is a 1930 American pre-Code drama film directed by Lewis D. Collins and written by Winnifred Reeve, C. Gardner Sullivan and Matt Taylor. The film stars Mary Nolan, William Janney, Ralf Harolde, Mae Busch, George Irving and Claire McDowell. The film was released on June 8, 1930, by Universal Pictures.

Cast 
Mary Nolan as Helen Herbert
William Janney as Bobby Spencer
Ralf Harolde as Blackie
Mae Busch as May Roberts
George Irving as Mr. Spencer
Claire McDowell as Mrs. Spencer

References

External links 
 

1930 films
1930s English-language films
American drama films
1930 drama films
Universal Pictures films
Films directed by Lewis D. Collins
American black-and-white films
1930s American films